War Walks is a BBC documentary series presented by historian, Professor Richard Holmes. The series was about famous European battles which had British or English involvement. It included descriptions of the battles, the events leading up to them and the events resulting from them.

Episode list

Series One (1996)
 Agincourt (1415) (26 July 1996)
 Waterloo (1815) (2 August 1996)
 Mons and Le Cateau (1914) (9 August 1996)
 The Somme (1916) (16 August 1996)
 Arras (1940) (23 August 1996)
 Operation Goodwood (1944) (30 August 1996)

Series Two (1997)
 Hastings (1066) (14 November 1997)
 Bosworth Field (1485) (21 November 1997)
 Naseby (1645) (28 November 1997)
 The Boyne (1690) (5 December 1997)
 Dunkirk (1940) (12 December 1997)
 The Blitz (1940–41) (19 December 1997)

Sources 
 http://homepage.eircom.net/%257Eodyssey/Quotes/History/War_Walks.html#WarWalks2
 http://www.tvfactual.co.uk/
 http://www.bbc.co.uk/programmes/b00snyg6

External links
 

1996 British television series debuts
1997 British television series endings
1990s British documentary television series
British television documentaries
Documentary television series about war
English-language television shows
BBC television documentaries about history during the 20th Century
BBC television documentaries about history during the 18th and 19th centuries
BBC television documentaries about history during the 16th and 17th centuries
BBC television documentaries about medieval history